was a Japanese group rhythmic gymnast. She represents her nation at international competitions.

She participated at the 2008 Summer Olympics in Beijing. 
She also competed at world championships, including at the 2007 and 2009 World Rhythmic Gymnastics Championships.

References

External links

1990 births
Living people
Japanese rhythmic gymnasts
Place of birth missing (living people)
Gymnasts at the 2008 Summer Olympics
Olympic gymnasts of Japan
Universiade medalists in gymnastics
Universiade bronze medalists for Japan
Medalists at the 2011 Summer Universiade
20th-century Japanese women
21st-century Japanese women